Andrew William Varga (December 11, 1930 – November 4, 1992) was an American Major League Baseball pitcher who played for two seasons. He pitched with the Chicago Cubs for one game during the 1950 Chicago Cubs season and two games during the 1951 Chicago Cubs season. The ,  left-hander allowed two hits and six bases on balls in four Major League innings pitched.

Playing career

External links

1930 births
1992 deaths
Bradley Braves baseball players
Chicago Cubs players
Decatur Commodores players
Grand Rapids Jets players
Major League Baseball pitchers
Springfield Cubs players
Baseball players from Chicago